I Sing the Body Electro is the debut solo album of former Mantronix member Kurtis Mantronik. The album was released in 1998 on the Oxygen Music Works label and featured female MC Traylude on lead vocals.

Track listing
 "King of the Beats [Version 3.0]" (Kurtis Mantronik) – 6:44 
 "Mad" (T. Askins, Mantronik) – 4:18 
 "On the Beatbox" (Mantronik) – 3:53 
 "Push Yer Hands Up" (Askins, Mantronik) – 3:40 
 "One Time, Feel Fine" (Askins, Mantronik) – 3:51 
 "Original Electro" (Mantronik) – 3:56 
 "Seek and Destroy" (Mantronik) – 4:24 
 "Baby, You Blow My Mind" (C. Bush, A. Heermans, Mantronik) – 3:26 
 "Cow Bites Man" (Askins, Mantronik) – 3:23 
 "Bass Machine Re-Tuned" (Mantronik) – 4:29 
 "Hush" (Mantronik) – 4:00

External links
 [ I Sing The Body Electro] at Allmusic
 I Sing The Body Electro at Discogs

1998 debut albums
Kurtis Mantronik albums
Albums produced by Kurtis Mantronik